"Disparate Youth" is a song from American musician Santigold. The track was released in the United States on 14 February 2012 as the lead single from the artist's second studio album, Master of My Make-Believe (2012).

In September 2012, "Disparate Youth" became the soundtrack to insurance company Direct Line's latest television advertisement. In December 2012, an instrumental version of the song was used by Honda for their television advertisement, "Things Can Always Be Better". Direct Line also utilised the track for a range of adverts between 2012 and 2014. The song is also featured in the video games Forza Horizon and NBA 2K16. It has also been used to advertise YouTube's Geek Week in August 2013. The song was also used in the Netflix original series Atypical, in season one, episode six, during the end credits, and featured in Good Girls. “Disparate Youth” was featured in the 2020 trailer for the Netflix series “Unorthodox.”

Critical reception
In March 2012, The Guardian heralded "Disparate Youth" as part of his 'New Music' feature. Reviewer Michael Cragg hailed it as "an absolute corker, all sleek new-wave keyboards mixed with frantic bursts of guitar and Santigold's intriguingly emotionless delivery."

Track listing

Charts
For the chart week dated April 21, 2012, "Disparate Youth" debuted at number ninety-six on the UK Singles Chart; marking the artist's second appearance on the chart—following "L.E.S. Artistes" (number 27, 2008).

Release history

Music video 
Santigold and filmmaker Sam Fleischner co-directed a "Disparate Youth" music video shot in Portland Parish, Jamaica, which released in March 2012. The video, shot on a shoestring budget, shows Santigold riding a motorcycle through a colonial-era town, riding a speedboat off the coast, and entering a jungle with some young Jamaican locals. Fleischner has revealed that this was the second video shot for the song, following "a Clockwork Orange-inspired video that the label spent a lot of money on" which Santigold decided not to release.

References

2012 singles
Santigold songs
Songs written by Santigold
Songs written by Nick Zinner
2011 songs
Atlantic Records singles
Dubtronica songs